Tushar Chaudhary (born 18 December 1965) is an Indian politician and a leader of the Indian National Congress in Gujarat. He was elected to Gujarat Legislative Assembly in 2002 and 2022, and to Lok Sabha in 2004 and 2009.

Early life 
Chaudhary was born on 18 December 1965 in Bedkuvta Valod village in Surat district of Gujarat. He is a son of Amarsinh Chaudhary, a politician and former chief minister of Gujarat. He has studied MBBS from Maharaja Sayajirao University of Baroda.

Career 
He was elected from Vyara in 2002 Gujarat legislative assembly election. In 2004, he was elected to 14th Lok Sabha from Mandvi constituency. In 2009, he was elected to the 15th Lok Sabha from Bardoli constituency. He was the Union Minister of State for Tribal Affairs from 28 May 2009 to 28 September 2012. On 28 September 2012 he became the Union Minister of State for Road Transport and Highways.

He contested 2014 and 2019 Indian general elections from Bardoli but lost both times. In 2017 Gujarat legislative assembly election, he lost from Mahuva constituency. In 2022 Gujarat legislative assembly election, he contested and was elected from Khedbrahma constituency defeating his nearest rival Bharatiya Janata Party candidate Ashvin Kotwal.

Personal life 
In 1991, Chaudhary married Dipti Chaudhary. They have a daughter and a son.

Notes

External links 
 Official biographical sketch in Parliament of India website

1965 births
Living people
India MPs 2009–2014
India MPs 2004–2009
Indian National Congress politicians
Lok Sabha members from Gujarat
People from Tapi district
Indian National Congress politicians from Gujarat
Maharaja Sayajirao University of Baroda alumni
Indian medical doctors
Gujarat MLAs 2002–2007
Gujarat MLAs 2022–2027